Katja Wirth (born 2 April 1980) is a former Austrian alpine skier who won the Europa Cup overall title in 1995.

She is the sister of the alpine skier Patrick Wirth.

Career
During her career she has achieved 8 results among the top 10 (1 podium) in the World Cup.

World Cup results
Podium

Europa Cup results
Wirth has won two discipline cups in the Europa Cup.

FIS Alpine Ski Europa Cup
Super-G: 2002, 2006

References

External links
 

1980 births
Living people
Austrian female alpine skiers